Alfred Julius Eugster (February 11, 1909 – January 1, 1997) was an American animator, writer, and film director. He worked for a number of American animation studios, including Fleischer Studios, the Iwerks Studio, Walt Disney Productions, and Famous Studios.

Personal 
Al Eugster was born on February 11, 1909, in New York City. His parents were musician Julius Eugster and Hedwig Fiegel, both were from German descent. Between 1915 and 1919, his dad died when he was just a child. At the age of 16, he got paid $10 dollars a week for doing jobs and the American Radiator Company. Al Eugster was married to his wife Hazel, also known as Chick, for 61 years. The two had no children, and Hazel died in 1995.

Career 
Eugster began his career in animation in April 1925 where he worked at the Pat Sullivan studio. He would blacken in the drawing of Felix the Cat. During his time working for the Pat Sullivan studio, he worked under Otto Messmer. Eugster attended Cooper Union at nighttime to study art while also working. Al Eugster then left Sullivan's Studio in April 1929 and moved to Fleisher Studios. Eugster would return to Fleischer in 1939. In 1932, Eugster went to work for Mintz. He worked with Preston Blair on many films, most notably, Krazy Kat cartoons. Just a year later, he went on to work for Ub lwerks where he co-animated several ComiColor shorts with Shamus Culhane.

Eugster worked at Iwerks Studio until 1935, when he joined Walt Disney Animation Studios. His specialty while at Disney studio was the animation of Donald Duck as well as the works of Snow White. Eugster left Disney on March 18, 1939, due to an offer from Max Fleischer in Miami for a higher salary. Eugster re-joined Fleischer in 1939 and stayed with them until the studio closed down in 1942. He would work briefly at Famous Studios but left for the US Army. After his release from the Army, he returned to Famous in 1945. Here he was the head animator and worked on a number of Screen Songs and Popeye cartoons until 1957. From 1957 to 1964, Eugster freelanced throughout New York working for various commercial studios. In 1964, he joined Paramount where he worked for Shamus Culhane and Ralph Bakshi until the studio closed in 1967. The following year, he joined Kim and Gifford, where he began his longest stay at a single studio. In September 1987, Eugster retired from Kim and Gifford, ending his 62-year career.

References

External links 
 "Al Eugster – Cartoon Animator." Contains a partial list of scenes animated by Eugster and photos from his personal files.
 Al Eugster entry from "Popeye Cartoons." Contains notes from Eugster's ledger and the only known clip of his Popeye animation.
 Al Eugster filmography from the British Film Institute

American film directors
American animated film directors
American animators
1909 births
1997 deaths
Fleischer Studios people
Walt Disney Animation Studios people
American people of German descent
Famous Studios people